"If I Could Bottle This Up" is a song written by Paul Overstreet and Dean Dillon.  It was recorded as a duet by country singers George Jones and Shelby Lynne and released as a single in September 1988, peaking at #43. It was Lynne's first single release and she would follow it with her debut LP Sunrise, which Billy Sherrill would also produce.  The song would later surface on the Jones duet compilation Friends in High Places in 1991.

George Jones version

Chart performance

Paul Overstreet version

Overstreet released his own version of the song in November 1991 as the fourth single from his album Heroes.  The song reached #30 on the Billboard Hot Country Singles & Tracks chart.

Chart performance

References

1988 singles
1991 singles
George Jones songs
Shelby Lynne songs
Paul Overstreet songs
Songs written by Dean Dillon
Songs written by Paul Overstreet
Song recordings produced by Brown Bannister
Song recordings produced by Billy Sherrill
Epic Records singles
RCA Records singles